This is a list of schools in Sheffield in the English county of South Yorkshire.

State-funded schools

Primary schools 

Abbey Lane Primary School
Abbeyfield Primary Academy
Acres Hill Community Primary School
Angram Bank Primary School
Anns Grove Primary School
Arbourthorne Community Primary School
Astrea Academy Sheffield
Athelstan Primary School
Ballifield Primary School
Bankwood Community Primary School
Beck Primary School
Beighton Infant School
Birley Primary Academy
Birley Spa Primary Academy
Bradfield Dungworth Primary School
Bradway Primary School
Brightside Infant School
Brook House Junior
Broomhill Infant School
Brunswick Community Primary School
Byron Wood Primary Academy
Carfield Primary School
Carter Knowle Junior School
Charnock Hall Primary Academy
Clifford All Saints CE Primary School
Coit Primary School
Concord Junior School
Deepcar St John's CE Junior School
Dobcroft Infant School
Dobcroft Junior School
Dore Primary School
E-ACT Pathways Academy
Ecclesall Primary School
Ecclesfield Primary School
Emmanuel CE/Methodist Junior School
Emmaus RC and CE Primary School
Fox Hill Primary
Gleadless Primary School
Greengate Lane Academy
Greenhill Primary School
Grenoside Community Primary School
Greystones Primary School
Halfway Infant School
Halfway Junior School
Hallam Primary School
Hartley Brook Primary School
Hatfield Academy
High Green Primary School
High Hazels Infant Academy
High Hazels Junior School
Hillsborough Primary School
Hinde House 2-16 School
Holt House Infant School
Hucklow Primary School
Hunter's Bar Infant School
Hunter's Bar Junior School
Intake Primary School
Limpsfield Junior School
Lound Infant School
Lound Junior School
Lowedges Junior Academy
Lower Meadow Primary School
Lowfield Community Primary School
Loxley Primary School
Lydgate Infant School
Lydgate Junior School
Malin Bridge Primary School
Manor Lodge Community Primary School
Mansel Primary
Marlcliffe Community Primary School
Meersbrook Bank Primary School
Meynell Community Primary School
Monteney Primary School
Mosborough Primary School
Mundella Primary School
Nether Edge Primary School
Nether Green Infant School
Nether Green Junior School
Netherthorpe Primary School
Nook Lane Junior School
Norfolk Community Primary School
Norton Free CE Primary School
Oasis Academy Don Valley
Oasis Academy Firvale
Oasis Academy Watermead
Oughtibridge Primary School
Owler Brook Primary School
Parson Cross CE Primary School
Phillimore Community Primary School
Pipworth Community Primary School
Porter Croft CE Primary Academy
Prince Edward Primary School
Pye Bank CE Primary School
Rainbow Forge Primary Academy
Reignhead Primary School
Rivelin Primary School
Royd Infant School
Sacred Heart RC School
St Ann's RC Primary School
St Catherine's RC Primary School
St John Fisher RC Primary
St Joseph's RC Primary School
St Marie's RC School
St Mary's CE Primary School
St Mary's RC Primary School
St Patrick's RC Voluntary Academy
St Theresa's RC Primary School
St Thomas More RC Primary
St Thomas of Canterbury RC Primary School
St Wilfrid's RC Primary School
Sharrow School
Shooter's Grove Primary School
Shortbrook Primary School
Southey Green Primary School
Springfield Primary School
Stannington Infant School
Stocksbridge Infant School
Stocksbridge Junior School
Stradbroke Primary School
Tinsley Meadows Primary School, Sheffield
Totley All Saints CE Primary School
Totley Primary School
Walkley Primary School
Watercliffe Meadow Community Primary School
Waterthorpe Infant School
Westways Primary School
Wharncliffe Side Primary School
Whiteways Primary School
Wincobank Infant School
Windmill Hill Primary School
Wisewood Community Primary School
Woodhouse West Primary School
Woodlands Primary School
Woodseats Primary School
Woodthorpe Primary School
Wybourn Community Primary School

Secondary schools 

All Saints Catholic High School
Astrea Academy Sheffield
The Birley Academy
Bradfield School
Chaucer School
Ecclesfield School
Fir Vale School
Firth Park Academy
Forge Valley School
Handsworth Grange Community Sports College
High Storrs School
Hinde House 2-16 School
King Ecgbert School
King Edward VII School
Meadowhead School
Mercia School
Newfield Secondary School
Notre Dame Catholic High School
Oasis Academy Don Valley
Outwood Academy City
Parkwood E-ACT Academy
Sheffield Park Academy
Sheffield Springs Academy
Silverdale School
Stocksbridge High School
Tapton School
UTC Sheffield City Centre
UTC Sheffield Olympic Legacy Park
Westfield School
Yewlands Academy

Special and alternative schools 

Archdale School
Becton School
Bents Green School
Discovery Academy
Heritage Park School
Holgate Meadows School
Kenwood Academy
Mossbrook School
The Rowan School
Seven Hills School
Sheffield Inclusion Centre
Talbot Specialist School
Woolley Wood School

Further education 
Chapeltown Academy
Longley Park Sixth Form
Sheffield College

Independent schools

Primary and preparatory schools
Mylnhurst Preparatory School

Senior and all-through schools
Al-Mahad Al-Islami
Bethany School
Birkdale School
Seraphic Academy
Sheffield High School
Westbourne School

Special and alternative schools
Brantwood Specialist School
Paces High Green School for Conductive Education
Phoenix School of Therapeutic Education

References

Schools in Sheffield
Sheffield
Schools in Sheffield
Schools